Northwestern Michigan College (NMC) is a public community college in Traverse City, Michigan.  Founded in 1951, it enrolls nearly 4,000 students. NMC offers associate degrees and professional certificates, bachelor's degrees through the Great Lakes Maritime Academy and Great Lakes Water Studies Institute, and bachelor's and master's degrees granted by partner universities through NMC's University Center.

NMC has a branch campus on Grand Traverse Bay that houses the Great Lakes Culinary Institute, Great Lakes Maritime Academy, Great Lakes Water Studies Institute and Hagerty Conference Center. Another branch campus near Cherry Capital Airport is home to NMC's aviation and automotive service technology programs, and offers training in manufacturing, construction, renewable energy and information technology. NMC also has an observatory (the Rogers Observatory) and an ACEN (Accreditation Commission for Education in Nursing) accredited nursing program that has a long-standing association with nearby Munson Medical Center. The campus is home to WNMC-FM, which began as a student organization in 1967, and is now a community radio station broadcasting at 90.7 FM.

Dennos Museum Center
The Dennos Museum Center is a museum of fine art affiliated with Northwestern Michigan College. The museum consists of an outdoor sculpture garden, several galleries for temporary exhibits, and the Inuit Gallery. It offers an array of exhibitions and programs in the visual arts, sciences and performing arts.  The Museum's signature collection is Inuit art of the Canadian Arctic, one of the largest and most historically complete collections of these distinctive sculptures and prints in the United States.

Opened in 1991, the Museum Center features three changing exhibit galleries and a sculpture court; a hands-on Discovery Gallery and an Inuit Art Gallery; and the Milliken Auditorium.  A significant collection of outdoor sculptures by international and Michigan artists surround the Museum on the campus of Northwestern Michigan College.

Great Lakes Maritime Academy

NMC is home to the Great Lakes Maritime Academy, one of six state-operated maritime academies that receives aid from the federal Maritime Administration.  As NMC is located on the shores of Grand Traverse Bay, a long protected water of Lake Michigan, Great Lakes Maritime Academy is the only U.S. Maritime Academy on fresh water.

In 2013, Northwestern Michigan College won approval from the Higher Learning Commission to offer a Bachelor of Science degree in maritime technology through the academy, becoming the first community college in Michigan to be able to offer its own accredited bachelor's degree. The college awarded its first bachelor's degrees to two academy students in January, 2014.

Notable alumni
 Andrea Lynn Kritcher
 Chasten Buttigieg
 Jerry Dennis
 Aaron Draplin
 Kevin Elsenheimer
 Michael Masley
 Bart Stupak
 Jason Allen

References

External links
Official website

 
Traverse City, Michigan
Community colleges in Michigan
Maritime colleges in the United States
Educational institutions established in 1951
Education in Grand Traverse County, Michigan
Buildings and structures in Grand Traverse County, Michigan
Two-year colleges in the United States
1951 establishments in Michigan